Harperley is a small village in County Durham, England.  It is situated between Tantobie to the north east, Tanfield Lea to the east, Stanley to the south, East Kyo to the south east and Catchgate, West Kyo and Annfield Plain to the west.

Harperley consists of two parts; the southern part (consisting of seven houses) is set around crossroads from which there is easy access to West Kyo, Catchgate, Annfield Plain and Stanley.  The northern part (consisting of three houses and a farm) is grouped around the Harperley Hotel, a now closed public house formerly known locally for meals and hosting wedding functions.

The grounds surrounding the Harperley Hotel used to be the site of a zoo (in the 1960s) and a children's playground (as late as the 1980s).  A local stream called the Kyo Burn flows through the grounds, which lower down its course is known as Beamish Burn and later the River Team before it flows into the River Tyne.

Weardale Railway

However, even though the station site is still extant, the Weardale Railway passes Harperley en-route between Witton-le-Wear and Wolsingham.

The village itself, is in-fact located further north from the site of the station.

References

External links

Villages in County Durham
Stanley, County Durham